The 1991 World Taekwondo Championships were the 10th edition of the World Taekwondo Championships, and were held in Athens from October 28 to November 3, 1991, with 434 athletes participating from 49 countries.

Medal summary

Men

Women

Medal table

References

WTF Medal Winners

World
World Taekwondo Championships
World Taekwondo Championships
Taekwondo Championships
Taekwondo in Greece